Hansjürgen Matthies (6 March 1925 – 22 August 2008) was a German pharmacologist and neuroscientist.

He served as a professor and the Institute Director at the Magdeburg Medical Academy, and was also the director of another academic institute outside the university.   Colleagues describe him as "the doyen of Neuroscience in Magdeburg" and more widely in the German Democratic Republic.    After the political changes of 1989/90 his work continued at the institution now remodelled as the Otto-von-Guericke University Magdeburg and the closely associated Leibnitz Institute for Neurobiology.

Life
Matthies was born in Stettin in 1925.   During the Second World War he was a soldier, joining the NSDAP (Nazi Party) in 1943, the year of his eighteenth birthday.   Towards the end of the war he was captured by the British, and on his release he became a member of the Socialist Unity Party of Germany (Sozialistische Einheitspartei Deutschlands / SED), newly formed in April 1946 in the Soviet occupation zone within what remained of Germany.   He embarked on the study of medicine, obtaining his doctorate, which he produced under the supervision of Friedrich Jung, from the Humboldt University of Berlin in 1953.   He received his habilitation, a further academic qualification, in 1957.

In 1957 he took over as director (installed from 1957 till 1960 as "acting director") of the Institute for Pharmacology and Toxicology which had been recently established within the Magdeburg Medical Academy.   He became a professor in 1959 and in 1960 was given a teaching professorship at The Academy.   Between 1962 and 1967, and again from 1973 till 1979, he was also Rector of the Medical Academy.

In 1981 he founded the Magdeburg Institute for Neurbiology and Brain research, which he headed up as its Director.  During 1992/93 Magdeburg University underwent a far reaching reconfiguration, which led to its re-emergence with a new name.  The Research Institute that Mattheis had founded back in the days of the German Democratic Republic re-emerged in 1991/92 as the Leibnitz Institute for Neurobiology.  However, in 1990 Hansjürgen Matthies had reached his sixty-fifth birthday, and this was the year in which he formally retired from his academic responsibilities.

He died in Magdeburg in 2008.

Work

He was the author of 467 scientific publications including at least 11 substantial works.   The focus of his research was on the cellular mechanisms involved in human memory functions.

Awards and honours
 1965 Patriotic Order of Merit in Bronze
 1968 National Prize of East Germany
 1971 Corresponding member (East) German Academy of Sciences
 1973 Full member (East) German Academy of Sciences
 1989 Outstanding Scientist of the People

Further reading 
  Matthies, Hansjürgen. In: Werner Hartkopf: Die Berliner Akademie der Wissenschaften. Ihre Mitglieder und Preisträger 1700–1990. Akademie Verlag, Berlin 1992, P. 233.
  Hansjürgen Matthies. In: Monika Zimmermann (Editor/compiler): Was macht eigentlich...? 100 DDR-Prominente heute. Ch. Links, Berlin 1994, P. 180−182.
  Hansjürgen Matthies: Die Entwicklung der Neurowissenschaften in der DDR. Leute, Ereignisse und das Gedächtnis. Posthum herausgegeben von Renate Matthies, Henry Matthies, Jan Matthies, Janine Haschker, geb. Matthies. Klotz Verlag, Eschborn bei Frankfurt am Main und Magdeburg 2012, .

References

1925 births
2008 deaths
Physicians from Szczecin
People from the Province of Pomerania
Nazi Party members
Socialist Unity Party of Germany members
East German physicians
German pharmacologists
German neuroscientists
20th-century German physicians
Academic staff of Otto von Guericke University Magdeburg
Members of the German Academy of Sciences at Berlin
German military personnel of World War II
German prisoners of war in World War II held by the United Kingdom
Recipients of the National Prize of East Germany
Recipients of the Patriotic Order of Merit in bronze